The 1944 Cork Intermediate Hurling Championship was the 35th staging of the Cork Intermediate Hurling Championship since its establishment by the Cork County Board in 1909.

Ballyhea Rovers won the championship following a 2-04 to 0-01 defeat of Oldcastletown in the final. This was their second championship title overall and their first title since 1931.

Results

Final

References

Cork Intermediate Hurling Championship
Cork Intermediate Hurling Championship